The Model S was the first four-seat passenger car produced by Oldsmobile in 1906, offered as a larger alternative to the Model R Curved Dash runabout that appeared in 1901. The advertised price was $2,250 ($ in  dollars ). It was Oldsmobile's first four cylinder car and took the top level marketing position above the Model L and the entry-level Model R. It was one of the last independently developed products before they joined General Motors in 1908, and competed against Buick, Ford and other automakers at the time. It was built at the Oldsmobile factory in Detroit and developed by Frederick and Angus Smith, whose father Samuel L. Smith was the primary investor, and R. E. Olds had left the company due to an argument with Oldsmobile Board of Directors.

History

The Model S was equipped with a side-valve, in-line  four-cylinder engine developing 28 bhp. The engine was installed in the front, driving the rear wheels through a transmission shaft. The gearbox had three forward gears, with the gearshift lever positioned to the right of the driver. The brake pedal came into contact with the Drum brake on the rear wheels. 

Uniquely, one retail price of US$2,250 was charged for each body style, while the Buick Four was US$900 ($ in  dollars ).

1,400 Model S were manufactured in 1906, and it was replaced by the Model A in 1907.

References

Model S
1900s cars

Brass Era vehicles